Dinkar Desai (21 October 1916 – 26 December 1985) was an Indian cricket umpire. He stood in three Test matches between 1955 and 1956.

See also
 List of Test cricket umpires
 New Zealand cricket team in India in 1955–56
 Australian cricket team in India in 1956–57

References

1916 births
1985 deaths
Place of birth missing
Indian Test cricket umpires